Mohamed Saeed Afifa  is a Qatari football forward who played for Qatar in the 1984 Asian Cup.

References

External links
Stats

Qatar international footballers
Qatari footballers
Al-Rayyan SC players
Qatar Stars League players
1984 AFC Asian Cup players
1962 births
Living people
Place of birth missing (living people)
Association football midfielders